Hollidaysburg Area Senior High School is the midsized, suburban public high school for the Hollidaysburg Area School District. The Senior High School is located at 1510 North Montgomery Street in Hollidaysburg, Blair County. The high school serves the populations living in Hollidaysburg, Duncansville, Newry, and a small portion of Altoona (Eldorado).  

According to the National Center for Education Statistics, this high school reported an enrollment of eight hundred and forty pupils in grades ten through twelve during the 2018-2019 academic year.

History
The original Senior High was located on the second floor of a business building at 308 Allegheny Street before eventually moving to 1000 Hewitt Street, where the current junior high is today. Prior to 1956, elementary schools in the district included seventh and eighth grades. Overcrowding in Frankstown and Duncansville led to a joint decision by the school board and the department of Public Instruction to approve an addition to the senior high, which became the new junior high school. The junior and senior high schools co-existed and brought relief to the elementary schools when the seventh and eighth grade classes were transferred; however, the increasing student population did not halt. As a result, a new Senior High was approved during the 1960s.

The existing junior-senior high building was then converted to a junior high school, which remains today. The present-day senior high includes tenth, eleventh and twelfth grades and is located on North Montgomery St. while the Junior High still exists at its prior location. 

The senior high school launched a renovation project with construction starting in January 2009. The renovations include a new gymnasium and more classrooms. The school will also have a new geo-thermal heating system along with the traditional gas system.

Building Features
The inside of the school contains a gymnasium, swimming pool, planetarium, and auditorium. Outside the school are a baseball field, baseball practice facility, cross country course, and soccer field. The school also has a band practice field and an amphitheater.

Students

Extracurriculars
The district offers an extensive variety of clubs, activities and many sports.

Clubs and organizations
Hollidaysburg Area Senior High School offers a variety of clubs and organizations to its students. The clubs include Marching Band, TigerPaws (Dance team) Fantazia(Choir), Concert Choir, Orchestra, Concert Band, Jazz Band, Symphonic Wind Ensemble (SWE), Experimental Jazz (E-Jazz), Chimrock (School Yearbook), FBLA (Future Business Leaders of America), Foreign Language Clubs (French, German, Italian), Tiger Times (Newspaper), Tiger TV, HARP (Hollidaysburg Area Repertory Players, the school's drama club), Key Club, Mock Trial, Peer Mediation, Recycling Club, TAAD (Tigers Against Alcohol and other Drugs), Scholastic Scrimmage Team, Student Council, Prom Committee, and DDR Club.

Sports
The District funds:

Boys
Baseball - AAA
Basketball -AAAA
Cross Country - AAA
Football - AAA
Golf - AAA
Indoor Track and Field - AAAA
Soccer - AAA
Swimming and Diving - AAA
Tennis - AAA
Track and Field - AAA
Wrestling	 - AAA

Girls
Basketball - AAAA
Cross Country - AAA
Golf - AAA
Indoor Track and Field - AAAA
Soccer (Fall) - AAA
Swimming and Diving - AAA
Softball - AAA
Girls' Tennis - AAA
Track and Field - AAA
Volleyball - AAA

According to PIAA directory July 2012

Athletics
The School also recognizes a club hockey team, which competes in the Pennsylvania Interscholastic Hockey League (PIHL). The team currently supports a varsity team, JV Team and freshman (junior high) team, as well as several elementary teams. The football and soccer teams (select games only) play their games at Tiger Stadium, which is located between the junior and senior high schools, while the hockey team plays at Galactic Ice in Altoona.

Football
The program currently competes in class AAAAA of the PIAA and is independent. The first season was in 1920 and the team had a 4–2 record under George Carl. The program today has five hundred and eighty wins. The team has won ten District Championships: five under head coach Harold Price (1985, 1989, 1990, 1993, 1995), three under current head coach John Barton (1999, 2006, 2008) and three  under head coach Homer Delattre (2017, 2018).

Construction began in the spring of 2004 on a new artificial turf to replace the existing grass field. The new field provided the opportunity for other sports and events to use the facility as well. Two renovated concession stands and an information kiosk were also completed. Tiger Stadium is being updated by the restore the roar project. This project includes new turf, fixed lighting, new fencing, and the addition of field houses for home and away teams.

Record since 1998

Basketball
The men's basketball team competes in Class AAAA while women's basketball competes in Class AAA in the PIAA. Both also right now have no conference, but continue to play perennial rivals Altoona and State College. Brad Lear coaches the men while Deanna Jubeck coaches the women.

Soccer
The men's and women's soccer team rank AAA, the highest ranking for soccer. Both teams compete in District 6, which the women won in 2005 and 2007. The 2005 men's team beat #3 ranked State College 1-0 to win the District 6 Championship. The 2005 women's team also set a district six record, becoming the first team from the district to make it to the State semi-finals. The men are coached by Greg Shale while Dave Soellner finished 2008 as his first for the Lady Tigers.

Notable alumni
 Jeff Bower - Head Coach, Men's Basketball, Marist College
Charlie Brenneman (class of 1999) - wrestler; professional MMA fighter, formerly in the UFC's Lightweight Division
Billy Clapper (class of 2001) - Head Coach, Men's Basketball, Penn State Altoona
Sam Lafferty - (2009-2011) Ice Hockey, Forward, Pittsburgh Penguins
 Karen Davis (class of 1962) - animal rights advocate
 Wade Schalles - member of the National Wrestling Hall of Fame
 Judy Ward - Member, Pennsylvania House of Representatives
 Luke Rhodes - Professional football player, Indianapolis Colts
 Jim Fall - Film director, The Lizzie McGuire Movie

References

References

Educational institutions established in 1877
Public high schools in Pennsylvania
Schools in Blair County, Pennsylvania
1877 establishments in Pennsylvania